Unaroo is a 1984 Indian Malayalam-language political drama film directed by Mani Ratnam and written by T. Damodaran, starring Mohanlal, Sukumaran, Ratheesh, Sabitha Anand, Ashokan and Balan K. Nair, with music composed by Ilaiyaraaja and cinematography by Ramachandra Babu. The film gives the inside view of the problems that arose in the labour trade union parties in Kerala. It was released on 14 April 1984.

Plot 
This is the story of a group of workers who defy their union leaders in order to help a new factory materialize.

Cast 

Mohanlal as Ramu
Sukumaran as Janardanan
Ratheesh as Peter
Sabitha Anand as Marry
Balan K. Nair
Unni Mary
Krishnachandran
Ashokan
Jagannatha Varma
Lalu Alex
Kundara Johny
Prathapachandran
Philomina
Paravoor Bharathan
Janardhanan
Sathyakala

Production 
Producer N. G. John, who had experienced success with Ee Nadu (1982) and Iniyengilum (1983), had been impressed with Mani Ratnam's debut film Pallavi Anu Pallavi (1983), a Kannada film that tackled a complex subject. John offered Ratnam the chance to direct a Malayalam film for his production house. Ratnam initially narrated the script of Mouna Ragam (1986), then titled Divya, to John but the producer wanted to make a political film. Subsequently, he began work on Unaroo, which revolved around corruption in the labour union movement and scripted the film alongside John and Damodaran. Ratnam revealed that he struggled with the film, owing to its alien concept from his previous film on human relationships, as well as due to the sheer number of artistes involved. The film began production in February 1984 and was shot in a single stretch.

Soundtrack 
The music was composed by Ilaiyaraaja and the lyrics were written by Yusufali Kechery.

References

Bibliography

External links 

1980s Malayalam-language films
1980s political drama films
1984 films
Films directed by Mani Ratnam
Films scored by Ilaiyaraaja
Films with screenplays by T. Damodaran
Indian political drama films